Elise Malmberg (born 13 July 1995) is a Swedish athlete specialising in the 400 metres hurdles. She represented her country at the 2015 World Championships in Beijing reaching the semifinals. In addition she won the gold at the 2015 European U23 Championships. Her personal best in the 400 metres hurdles is 55.88 seconds set in Tallinn in 2015. Her indoor 400 metres best is 53.81 (Prague 2015).

International competitions

References

External links

1995 births
Living people
Swedish female hurdlers
World Athletics Championships athletes for Sweden
Place of birth missing (living people)
Athletes (track and field) at the 2016 Summer Olympics
Olympic athletes of Sweden